In mathematics, a dendroid is a type of topological space, satisfying the properties that it is hereditarily unicoherent (meaning that every subcontinuum of X is unicoherent), arcwise connected, and forms a continuum. The term dendroid was introduced by Bronisław Knaster lecturing at the University of Wrocław, although these spaces were studied earlier by Karol Borsuk and others.

 proved that dendroids have the fixed-point property: Every continuous function from a dendroid to itself has a fixed point.  proved that every dendroid is tree-like, meaning that it has arbitrarily fine open covers whose nerve is a tree.
was solved in the negative by David P. Bellamy, who gave an example of a tree-like continuum without the fixed-point property.

In Knaster's original publication on dendroids, in 1961, he posed the problem of characterizing the dendroids which can be embedded into the Euclidean plane. This problem remains open.

A locally connected dendroid is called a dendrite.  A cone over the Cantor set (called a Cantor fan) is an example of a dendroid that is not a dendrite.

References

Continuum theory
Trees (topology)